The Tres Marías amazon (Amazona tresmariae) is a species of bird in subfamily Arinae of the family Psittacidae, the African and New World parrots. It is endemic to the Islas Marías off the Pacific coast of Mexico.

Taxonomy

The Tres Marías amazon was formally described in 1900 by the American naturalist Edward William Nelson. He considered it as a subspecies of the yellow-headed amazon (Amazona oratrix) and introduced the trinomial name Amazona oratrix tresmariae. Frank Gill, Pamela Rasmussen and David Donsker in the list maintained on behalf of the International Ornithological Committee (IOC) treat the Tres Marías amazon as a full species based on a 2004 study that analyzed differences in mitochondrial DNA sequences. However, the American Ornithological Society, BirdLife International's Handbook of the Birds of the World (HBW), the Clements taxonomy, and the Howard and Moore checklist all retain it as a subspecies of the yellow-headed amazon.

The Tres Marías amazon sensu stricto is monotypic: no subspecies are recognized.

Description

The sexes are the same. Their upperparts are pale grass green with some darker feather tips and paler uppertail coverts. Their head, neck, throat, and upper breast are bright yellow and their lower breast and belly are bluish green. Their tail is mostly green with yellowish green tips and red at the base of the outer feathers. The leading edge of their wing and their carpal area are red. Their primaries and inner secondaries have green bases, the outer secondaries have red bases, and all are blue to blackish or bluish violet at the end. The rest of their underwing is green. Their iris is orange or amber, their bill pale to grayish horn-colored, and their legs and feet gray.

Distribution and habitat

It primarily inhabits forest but has been noted roosting in Agave plantations.

Behavior

Feeding

The diet of the Tres Marías amazon has not been described separately from that of the yellow-headed parrot sensu lato, which like most Amazonas parrots feeds mostly on seeds and fruits.

Breeding

The breeding biology of the Tres Marías amazon has not been described separately from that of the yellow-headed parrot. That species as a whole nests in tree cavities. Their clutch size is two or three eggs.

Vocalization

As of early 2023 xeno-canto had no recordings of Tres Marías amazon vocalizations and the Cornell Lab of Ornithology's Macaulay Library had very few.

In aviculture

In aviculture, a variety of yellow-headed amazon has been selectively bred to maximize the yellow coloration of the head. Called the "Magna", it closely resembles the Tres Marías amazon.

Status

The IUCN follows HBW taxonomy, and so has not assessed the Tres Marías amazon separately from the yellow-headed amazon sensu lato. The species as a whole is Endangered, with an estimated population of 4700 mature individuals that is believed to be decreasing. Illegal capture for the pet trade has caused much of the decline and ongoing habitat loss is another significant threat. The Convention on International Trade in Endangered Species of Wild Fauna and Flora (CITES) lists the yellow-headed amazon in Appendix I.

References

Tres Marías amazon
Endemic birds of Western Mexico
Fauna of Islas Marías
Tres Marías amazon
Taxobox binomials not recognized by IUCN